A Hoosier Romance is a 1918 Selig Polyscope silent film, featuring actress Colleen Moore.

Plot
Pretty Patience Thompson, a "girl with a singing soul," lives with her cold-hearted and avaricious father, Jeff Thompson, on their Indiana farm. Her life of drudgery is brightened by John, the hired hand, but when he asks for her hand in marriage, the old man flies into a rage and discharges him. Soon an aged but wealthy widower courts Patience, and although she still loves John, "Old Jeff" orders her to marry the widower, claiming that a father's will is the law. Aware of her unhappiness, the kindly squire and his wife arrange for John to hide in the Thompson home on the day of the wedding. With all of the guests assembled, Patience runs from the room and pretends to escape on a horse, and while the two old men search the fields for her, she quietly marries John.

Cast
 Colleen Moore - Patience Thompson 
 Thomas Jefferson - Jeff Thompson 
 Harry McCoy - John
 Edward Jobson - The squire
 Eugenie Besserer - The squire's wife    
 Frank Hayes - The widower

Details
Filmed in California but set in Indiana, the film is based on a story by James Whitcomb Riley. In A Hoosier Romance, the author appeared posthumously as the narrator of the film, the material taken from previously shot images of him telling stories to children.

References
Notes

Bibliography
Jeff Codori (2012), Colleen Moore; A Biography of the Silent Film Star, McFarland Publishing,(Print , EBook ).

External links

 

Films directed by Colin Campbell
Films set in Indiana
Films shot in California
American silent feature films
American black-and-white films
Films based on works by James Whitcomb Riley
1910s American films